KLHV may refer to:

 KLHV (FM), a radio station (88.5 FM) licensed to serve Cotton Valley, Louisiana, United States
 KVXO, a radio station (88.3 FM) licensed to serve Fort Collins, Colorado, United States, which held the call sign KLHV from 2003 to 2008 and 2008 to 2009
 William T. Piper Memorial Airport (ICAO code KLHV)